Robinson House, also known as the White House, is a historic home located at Wellsboro in Tioga County, Pennsylvania. It is a rectangular, two story, five bay Greek Revival style house built originally in 1813 with later modifications.  The  house has a cut stone foundation and partial basement.

It was listed on the National Register of Historic Places in 1977.

See also 
 National Register of Historic Places listings in Tioga County, Pennsylvania

References 

Houses on the National Register of Historic Places in Pennsylvania
Houses completed in 1813
Houses in Tioga County, Pennsylvania
National Register of Historic Places in Tioga County, Pennsylvania